Benjamin McGee Jr. (born January 26, 1939) is a former American football player and coach.  He played professionally as a defensive end for nine seasons in the National Football League (NFL) with the Pittsburgh Steelers.  He played college football at Jackson State University.    McGee served as head football coach at the University of Arkansas at Pine Bluff for four seasons, from 1980 to 1983, compiling a record of 17–22–4.

Head coaching record

References

External links
 

1939 births
Living people
American football defensive ends
American football defensive tackles
Arkansas–Pine Bluff Golden Lions football coaches
Jackson State Tigers football coaches
Jackson State Tigers football players
Mississippi Valley State Delta Devils football coaches
Pittsburgh Steelers players
Eastern Conference Pro Bowl players
Sportspeople from Starkville, Mississippi
Coaches of American football from Mississippi
Players of American football from Mississippi
African-American coaches of American football
African-American players of American football
21st-century African-American people
20th-century African-American sportspeople